Phoenix Bank of Nansemond is a historic bank building located at Suffolk, Virginia. It was built in 1921, and is a two-story, two bay, rectangular brick building.  The bank was founded by
a group of African-American entrepreneurs in 1919 and served the black farmers and laborers of Suffolk and surrounding Nansemond County. The bank survived until 1931.

It was added to the National Register of Historic Places in 1991.   It is located in the Suffolk Historic District.

References

African-American history of Virginia
Commercial buildings completed in 1921
Bank buildings on the National Register of Historic Places in Virginia
Buildings and structures in Suffolk, Virginia
National Register of Historic Places in Suffolk, Virginia
Individually listed contributing properties to historic districts on the National Register in Virginia
1921 establishments in Virginia